Arthur Hill Gillmor (March 12, 1824 – April 13, 1903) was a Canadian farmer, lumberman and Liberal politician from New Brunswick. He was the son of Daniel and Purmelia Gillmor, both native of New Brunswick. He was educated at the St. Andrews Grammar School, St. Andrews and later engaged in the local lumber and farming business. Mr. Gillmor married Hannah Dawes Howe, of Maine, in January 1846. They had four children: Daniel, Henry, Percy and Delia.

Mr. Gillmor sat in New Brunswick's House of Assembly for five terms, and gained a reputation for integrity. The last of these mandates was as provincial secretary in Albert James Smith's government, which had run on a platform opposing Confederation. When the Smith government was defeated in the 1866 election, Gillmor left politics for a time to concentrate on business.

After Confederation, he represented the riding of Charlotte, New Brunswick in the House of Commons of Canada from 1874 to 1896. He was a strong candidate for the office of Lieutenant-Governor of New Brunswick in 1899, being strongly endorsed by his former political opponents as well as supporters, but did not secure the appointment. He was subsequently appointed Canadian commissioner to the World's Fair at Paris. He was appointed to the Senate by Sir Wilfrid Laurier in 1900, where he served until his death in 1903, when he died on a train in Mattawamkeag, Maine while en route to Ottawa after a return trip to his hometown of St. George. Mr. Gillmor is buried in the St. George Rural Cemetery, in St. George, New Brunswick.

His son Daniel also served in the Senate from 1907 to 1918.

Electoral results

External links 
 Biography at the Dictionary of Canadian Biography Online
 

1824 births
1903 deaths
Canadian senators from New Brunswick
Liberal Party of Canada MPs
Liberal Party of Canada senators
Members of the House of Commons of Canada from New Brunswick
People from Saint Andrews, New Brunswick
New Brunswick Liberal Association MLAs
Provincial Secretaries of New Brunswick
People from Charlotte County, New Brunswick